The Cleveland Guardians Radio Network is an American radio network composed of 39 radio stations for the Cleveland Guardians, a professional baseball team in Major League Baseball (MLB). Cleveland sister stations WTAM and WMMS serve as the network's two flagships; WTAM also relays its signal over a low-power FM translator. The network also includes 26 affiliates in the U.S. states of Ohio, Pennsylvania, and New York: seventeen AM stations, eleven of which supplement their signals with low-power FM translators, eight full-power FM stations and one HD Radio subchannel that supplements its signal with a low-power FM translator.

Tom Hamilton and Jim Rosenhaus currently serve as the network's play-by-play announcers.  In addition to traditional over-the-air AM and FM broadcasts, network programming airs on SiriusXM satellite radio; and streams online via SiriusXM Internet Radio, TuneIn Premium, and MLB.com Gameday Audio.

History
In May 15, 1948, the first broadcast happened at Cleveland Municipal Stadium where the then-Indians met the Chicago White Sox  where broadcaster Van Patrick called the game where the Indians won 7-1.

Programming
Play-by-play announcers Tom Hamilton and Jim Rosenhaus call games on-site. Rosenhaus hosts Guardians Warm-Up, the network pregame show; and Hamilton hosts Guardians Wrap-Up, the network postgame show; both shows typically run 30 minutes each.

Additional network programming includes the following:
Guardians Update, a daily drive-time segment anchored by Rosenhaus
Guardians Weekly, a weekly year-round show hosted by Rosenhaus; airs on Saturday evenings
Note that not all network affiliates carry the latter two programs; co-flagship WTAM carries all originated network programming.

Announcers

Station list

Asterisk (*) indicates HD Radio broadcast.
Blue background indicates low-power FM translator.

Network map

References

External links
Guardians Radio Network
SiriusXM.com: Cleveland Guardians
TuneIn.com: Cleveland Guardians
MLB.com Gameday Audio

Cleveland Guardians
Major League Baseball on the radio
Radio in Cleveland
Sports radio networks in the United States